Tony Kett (1 June 1951 – 19 April 2009) was an Irish Fianna Fáil politician and member of Seanad Éireann. In 1997, he was elected to the 21st Seanad by the Administrative Panel. He was elected again in 2002 and in 2007.

Born in Woodlawn, County Galway, Kett was an administrator of the Central Remedial Clinic. He was reportedly a key member of the "Drumcondra Mafia", as Bertie Ahern's inner circle of constituency supporters are dubbed.

He was co-opted as member of Dublin City Council for the North Inner City electoral area in 1988 to replace Bertie Ahern (who had resigned when he was appointed a government minister) and was re-elected at the 1999 local elections. With the abolition of the dual mandate, he did not contest the 2004 local elections.

He died on 19 April 2009 of cancer. Tributes were led by Taoiseach Brian Cowen and Taoiseach Bertie Ahern.

Kett was succeeded in the Seanad by former County Louth councillor James Carroll.

References

1951 births
2009 deaths
Deaths from cancer in the Republic of Ireland
Fianna Fáil senators
Local councillors in Dublin (city)
Members of the 21st Seanad
Members of the 22nd Seanad
Members of the 23rd Seanad
Politicians from County Galway
Alumni of Dublin Institute of Technology
People educated at Garbally College